Isaac Chikwekwere Lamba is a Malawian diplomat and the current Ambassador of Malawi to Russia, presenting his credentials to Russian President Dmitry Medvedev on 5 February 2010. In 1984 he obtained a PhD from the University of Edinburgh, presenting the thesis 'The history of post-war western education in colonial Malawi 1945-61 : a study of the formulation and application of policy'.

References

Living people
Ambassadors of Malawi to Austria
Ambassadors of Malawi to Russia
Ambassadors of Malawi to Ukraine
Permanent Representatives of Malawi to the United Nations
Year of birth missing (living people)